Birch Hill Nightclub was a music venue and nightclub in Old Bridge Township, New Jersey. The venue ran into trouble in 2000 after an accidental drowning and drug raids, along with a loss of their liquor license. Birch Hill was sold in 2003 and is now a housing development. Many big-name bands played the venue, including Gov't Mule,  Dio, Scorpions, Hoobastank, Blue Öyster Cult, Cheap Trick, UFO, Iron Maiden, Rainbow, Eve 6, Toadies, Sudzert and Slayer.

References

2003 disestablishments in New Jersey
Music venues in New Jersey
Old Bridge Township, New Jersey
Nightclubs in New Jersey